Sophie Simnett (born 5 December 1997) is an English actress, known for her roles as Skye Hart on the Disney Channel musical series The Lodge and Samaira Dean on the Netflix drama series Daybreak.

Early life
Simnett was born in Hammersmith, West London. At the age of seven, she began taking various film and acting courses, and was educated at Putney High School.

Career
Simnett made her professional acting debut in Footsteps of Angels, a 2014 short film. She then appeared in the 2016 film Mum's List, as the younger version of Kate. On her eighteenth birthday, she was cast in the role of Skye Hart on the Disney Channel musical drama series The Lodge after thirteen auditions. She starred in The Lodge from 2016 to 2017, and was featured on two accompanying soundtracks for the series. Simnett also acted as a story consultant for the series. In 2018, she starred in the Christmas comedy film Surviving Christmas with the Relatives as Bee. In 2019, Simnett starred in the Netflix drama series Daybreak as Samaira Dean. She later portrayed the role of Red in the 2021 film Twist.

Filmography

Discography

Soundtrack albums

References

External links
 

1997 births
Actresses from London
English actresses
English child actresses
English television actresses
English film actresses
Living people
People educated at Putney High School
People from Chiswick
People from Putney